The 1996 S.League season is Geylang United's 1st season in the top flight of Singapore football and 21rd year in existence as a football club.

Squad

Sleague

S.League

Tiger Beer Series

Pionner Series

S.League Championship play-off

References

1996
Geylang United